The Battle of Fuente del Rodeo was the first armed encounter against Haiti in the Dominican War of Independence. It was fought on the 13 March 1844 in the province of Bahoruco. A force of Dominican troops, a portion of the Army of the South, led by General Fernando Taveras, defeated an outnumbering force of the Haitian Army led by Charles Rivière-Hérard. The Dominicans fought with stones, knives, machetes, lances, clubs and rifles.

References

Conflicts in 1844
Fuente del Rodeo
1844 in the Dominican Republic
March 1844 events